Mallee was an electoral district of the House of Assembly in the Australian state of South Australia from 1970 to 1985.

Mallee was abolished at the 1983 boundary redistribution, replaced by the Electoral district of Murray-Mallee from 1985. The last member for Mallee, Peter Lewis, went on to represent Murray-Mallee from December 1985.

Members

Election results

References 

Former electoral districts of South Australia
1970 establishments in Australia
1985 disestablishments in Australia